Tatlı is a village in the Kurtalan District of Siirt Province in Turkey. The village had a population of 75 in 2021.

References 

Kurdish settlements in Siirt Province
Villages in Kurtalan District